FC Espoo is a Finnish football club. It was based in the city of Espoo, Finland. Founded in 1989, the first team plays in the Finnish Second Division (Kakkonen), the third tier of the Finnish football pyramid.

The first team of FC Espoo plays its home games at Leppävaaran stadion in the district Leppävaara in the Greater Helsinki region.

Background
FC Espoo was founded in 1989 by the Leppävaaran Pallo and FC Kasiysi football clubs based in Espoo who now act as feeder clubs.

The club has played 9 seasons in the Kakkonen (Second Division), the first spell being in 1993 when they were relegated back to the Kolmonen (Third Division) after just one season and the second period being from 2002 until 2009 which culminated with promotion to the Ykkönen (First Division) for the first time.

Season to season

Club structure
The club runs a number of teams including 2 men's teams, 2 ladies' teams, FCE Akatemia and 3 other boys' teams and finally 2 girls' teams. A key mission of the club is to "work with Espoo football clubs to provide a first team for them and make it possible for footballers in Espoo to make progress in the sport."

A key operational objective is to provide the local clubs with talented and motivated young players that have had the best possible development opportunities. This is achieved by a high quality coaching, good training conditions and the empowerment of young players. A first team with a young age profile is the key way to support this objective.

Facilities used by the club include:

 Leppävaaran urheilupuisto (Leppävaara Sports Park)
 Laaksolahden kenttä and jalkapallohalli (Laaksolahti Playing Field and Football Hall)
 Keski-Espoon kenttä (Central Espoo Playing Field)

References and sources
Official Website
Finnish Wikipedia
Suomen Cup
 FC Espoo Facebook

Footnotes

Football clubs in Finland
Association football clubs established in 1989
Sport in Espoo
1989 establishments in Finland